Biathlon at the 2017 Asian Winter Games was held in Sapporo, Japan between 23–26 February at Nishioka Biathlon Stadium.

Schedule

Medalists

Men

Women

Mixed

Medal table

Participating nations
A total of 51 athletes from 8 nations competed in biathlon at the 2017 Asian Winter Games:

 
 
 
 
 
 
 
 

* Australia as guest nation, was ineligible to win any medals.

References

External links
Official Results Book – Biathlon

 
Biathlon at the Asian Winter Games
2017 Asian Winter Games events
2017 in biathlon